Gmina Prochowice is an urban-rural gmina (administrative district) in Legnica County, Lower Silesian Voivodeship, in south-western Poland.

Neighbouring gminas
Gmina Prochowice is bordered by the gminas of Kunice, Lubin, Malczyce, Ruja, Ścinawa and Wołów.

Villages
Apart from the town of Prochowice, the gmina contains the villages of Cichobórz, Dąbie, Golanka Dolna, Gromadzyń, Kawice, Kwiatkowice, Lisowice, Mierzowice, Motyczyn, Rogów Legnicki, Szczedrzykowice and Szczedrzykowice-Stacja.

Twin towns – sister cities

Gmina Prochowice is twinned with:
 Warburg, Germany

References

Prochowice
Legnica County